IK Tord is a Swedish football club located in Rosenlund in Jönköping. The club was formed on 10 September 1919 and has specialised in football and baseball.

Background
Since their foundation IK Tord has participated mainly in the middle divisions of the Swedish football league system. They play their home matches at Rosenlunds IP.

IK Tord have a thriving youth section running many youth teams of various age groups, from toddlers to juniors. They also ran ladies teams before this section broke away in 1990 to form IFK Jönköping.

IK Tord are affiliated to the Smålands Fotbollförbund.

Season to season

Attendances

In recent seasons IK Tord have had the following average attendances:

Footnotes

External links
 IK Tord – Official website

Sport in Jönköping
Football clubs in Jönköping County
Association football clubs established in 1919
1919 establishments in Sweden